Jakob Eckert (18 October 1916 – 5 June 1940) was a German international footballer. He was part of Germany's squad at the 1936 Summer Olympics, but he did not play in any matches.

Personal life
A Gefreiter in the German army, Eckert served in World War II, and died on 5 June 1940 in Villers-Carbonnel, France at the age of 23.

References

1916 births
1940 deaths
People from Alzey-Worms
Footballers from Rhineland-Palatinate
Association football forwards
German footballers
Germany international footballers
German Army personnel killed in World War II
German Army soldiers of World War II